Hysen Pulaku (born 8 December 1992) is an Albanian weightlifter. On July 23, 2012 Pulaku tested positive for stanozolol, a banned anabolic steroid. On July 28, the International Olympic Committee formally ejected Pulaku from the 2012 Summer Olympics in London where he was scheduled to compete in the men's 77kg division.

References

1992 births
Living people
Albanian male weightlifters
Doping cases in weightlifting
Albanian sportspeople in doping cases
Sportspeople from Elbasan
21st-century Albanian people